Jean-Michel Fourgous (born 30 September 1953 in Montreuil, Seine-Saint-Denis) is a member of the National Assembly of France.  He represents a part of the Yvelines department,  and is a member of the Union for a Popular Movement.

References

1953 births
Living people
People from Montreuil, Seine-Saint-Denis
Politicians from Île-de-France
Rally for the Republic politicians
Union for a Popular Movement politicians
The Republicans (France) politicians
Deputies of the 10th National Assembly of the French Fifth Republic
Deputies of the 12th National Assembly of the French Fifth Republic
Deputies of the 13th National Assembly of the French Fifth Republic
Mayors of places in Île-de-France